"Zero" is Fayray's 21st single. It was released on July 11, 2007.  The song was used as the theme song for the TBS TV Soap opera My Fair Boy. The coupling is a cover of Marvin Gaye's "Forever" (from his 1965 album How Sweet It Is to Be Loved by You).

Track listing
ゼロ (Zero)
Forever

Charts 
"Zero" - Oricon Sales Chart (Japan)

References

2007 singles
Fayray songs
Japanese television drama theme songs
2007 songs
Songs written by Fayray